Vladimir Leonidovich Sverdlov-Ashkenazy (born on July 21, 1976, Moscow) is a Russian pianist and composer.

Family 
Vladimir Sverdlov comes from a family of musicians. His grandfather David Ashkenazy was a pianist, accompanist and composer, People's Artist of the USSR.. His mother, Elena Ashkenazy, is a pianist and teaches piano at Musashino Academia Musicae in Tokyo. His uncle, Vladimir Ashkenazy, is a famous pianist and conductor.

Education 
Vladimir Sverdlov studied at the Central Music School at the Moscow Conservatory under Professor Vladimir Krainev. At the age of 14, in 1990, became the winner of the Moscow City Piano Competition. He continued his education at the Hannover Higher School of Music under Professor Arie Vardi.

Career 
At the age of 16, in 1992, Vladimir embarked on his first tour through Germany, accompanied by the Radio Frankfurt Orchestra conducted by Dmitry Kitayenko.

In 1993 Vladimir Sverdlov won the Grand Prix at the Citta di Senigallia International Competition in Italy.

In 1995 Vladimir made his Tel Aviv debut with the Israel Philharmonic Orchestra, performing Concerto No. 1 by Dmitri Shostakovich.

In 1997 Vladimir debuted with a solo recital at Tokyo's Suntory Hall.

In 1999 Vladimir was triumphant (Sixth Prize) at the Queen Elizabeth Competition in 1999 in Brussels. His performance has garnered him a great acclaim among the public and led to many professional engagements. After this the rapid rise of the pianist began. In 2000 Vladimir Sverdlov made his debut at the Great Hall of Concertgebouw. He performs regularly at important festivals including the Progetto Martha Argerich, collaborates with artists such as Mikhael Pletnev, Mischa Maisky, Martha Argerich and Alexander Vedernikov and performs internationally with major orchestras.

In 2006 Vladimir won the 14th International Monte-Carlo Piano Masters Competition. Critics noted his excellent technique and expressiveness.

In 2009 Vladimir Sverdlov first played several of his own compositions during his concert in Salle Gaveau in Paris.

In 2011 British music label "Piano classics" releases his album "Pictures at an Exhibition", which includes several Vladimir's own works. In the accompanying materials to the album he was named Vladimir Sverdlov-Ashkenazy for the first time, which is intended to symbolize his incarnation not only as a pianist, but also as a composer.

In 2013 Vladimir Sverdlov-Ashkenazy was granted the Manashir Yakubov Award "For Outstanding Mastery of Composing and Performing".

In April 2015 Vladimir Sverdlov-Ashkenazy took to the stage as a conductor, performing the Wolfgang Amadeus Mozart Concerto in D-moll k.466 with the Moscow Virtuosi Chamber Orchestra an the Svetlanov Hall of the Moscow International House of Music.

In March 2015 the composer presented the project "Reflection" in collaboration with theatre and film actor Georgy Taratorkin at the Small Hall of the Moscow Conservatory, in which Sverdlov-Ashkenazy played improvisations to Alexander's Blok poetry, which was named the high point of the Moscow cultural life in those days. In November 2015 Vladimir Sverdlov-Ashkenazy tried himself in the improvisation jenre again, creating new pieces on the spot, and had success with the audience. The artist periodically returns to the genre of improvisation.

In 2019, Vladimir released his solo album "Vision Fugitive - Piano Creations", containing 15 original piano pieces. In the same year, his first video clip for the title composition of the album "Vision Fugitive" was released, where Vladimir is personally represented as an author, actor and pianist.

In 2021, Vladimir released his work Mystery on digital platforms, which can be called a requiem, since it is dedicated to the memory of a girl who passed away.

Music

Discography 

 Frédéric Chopin, Vladimir Sverdlov – "Piano Works"; CD, Cypres, 1999
 Modest Mussorgsky, Vladimir Sverdlov – "Modest Mussorgsky: Pictures at an Exhibition"; CD, Piano Classics, 2011
 Vladimir Sverdlov-Ashkenazy – "Vision Fugitive (Piano Creations)"; Digital, Pancher, 2019
 Vladimir Sverdlov-Ashkenazy – "Mystery"; Digital, Pancher, 2021

Video clips 
Vision Fugitive — Pancher, 2019

Music for movies 

Sapsan, I Love You – Feature Film, 2012
Good God! – Feature Film, 2012
Birthday – Short Film, 2016.
Girl with a Scythe – Feature Film, Epic Media, 2018
 Dina Rubina. On the Sunny Side – Documentary Film, AB-TV Production, 2019

Significant performances 

 Prelude op. 9 for violin and piano, solo by Dmitry Kogan (violin) – performed at Festival de Menton, 2009
 Variations for Piano – performed at Festival de l'Athénée, Geneva, 2010
 Piano Sonata – performed at the Pianissimo Festival, Torredembarra, Spain, 2012
 Performance at the closing ceremony of the "Mirror" Film Festival named in honor of Andrei Tarkovsky, 2013
 "American Pictures", Fantasia for clarinet and piano – performed at the Chamber Hall of the Moscow International House of Music, 2013
 "Beautiful Mind", Septet – performed at the Chamber Hall of the Moscow International House of Music, 2014
 Burlesque – performed at the Seoul Arts Center, 2014
 Fantasy for piano and orchestra (in memory of David Ashkenazy) – performed at the Svetlanov Hall of the Moscow International House of Music, 2015
 Andante in Memory of Dmitry Kogan – performed at the Moscow Conservatory, 2018
 Romance, The Hope – both performed at The Organ Hall in Chisinau, 2018
 Ballade (in honor of Baron Arie Van Lysebeth) – performed at Flagey in Brussels, 2019
 Schumaniana (dedicated to Robert Schumann) – performed at the Wilhelm Kempf Academy in Positano, 2019

Sheet music publications 
Fantasia op.11 for violin, viola and piano – Moscow Publishing House "Muzyka", 2010

Social activities 
Vladimir Sverdlov founded the Schwarzstein Arts Production Concert Association in Belgium and established the Chiba Festival (competition for young pianists in Japan) and the Moscow Art Center "Music With No Rules".

References

External links 
 Official website

Russian composers
Russian pianists
21st-century Russian conductors (music)

1976 births
Living people